Cyprus is divided into six districts, whose capitals share the same name. The districts are subdivided into municipalities and communities. The districts of Cyprus are listed in the table below.

Note: Northern Cyprus-controlled lands are included in the area figures, but population was not enumerated there. The UN Buffer Zone is included in both population and area figures.  Akrotiri and Dhekelia are not included in the area figures, but non-military Cypriot citizens residing there were enumerated.

See also
 List of cities, towns and villages in Cyprus
 ISO 3166-2:CY
 Districts of Northern Cyprus

References

External links
 CityMayors article
 Cyprus at geo.webnabor.com

 
Subdivisions of Cyprus
Cyprus, Districts
Districts, Cyprus
Cyprus geography-related lists